The Porter Valley Parks are a series of public parks and green spaces in Sheffield, England. Lying along the valley of Porter Brook, they run radially out from the city centre, providing a direct green-space connection to the Peak District national park. Created variously between 1855 and 1938, they comprise in order from the city centre; Endcliffe Park, Bingham Park, Whiteley Woods, Forge Dam Park and Porter Clough.

The parks are listed at Grade II on the Register of Historic Parks and Gardens. The Friends of the Porter Valley is a registered charity which supports their mianitenance and improvement.

Parks
In 1924 Patrick Abercrombie said of the parks, "The Porter Brook Parkway, consisting as it does of a string of contiguous open spaces, is the finest example to be found in this country of a radial park strip, an elongated open space, leading from a built-up part of the city direct into the country, the land occupied being a river valley and so for the greater part unsuitable for building."

Besides green spaces, the parks contain various recreational facilities and historic monuments.

The Porter Valley Parks are included as a part of the Sheffield Round Walk.

Endcliffe Park

Endcliffe Park comprises  and is adjacent to Sheffield city centre. It was opened in 1887 to commemorate the Jubilee of Queen Victoria.

The park is home to three monuments dedicated to Queen Victoria, as well as the "Mi Amigo" memorial and ten American Oak trees, marking the crash site of a USAAF B-17 Flying Fortress.

Bingham Park

It was originally donated to the people of Sheffield in 1911, by inductrialist Sir John E Bingham, and was later expanded. Situated up a hillside, it offers good views out over the valley.

Whiteley Woods

The woodland and an existing dam and goit were also acquired in stages. In 1897/98 T Walter Hall presented land to Sheffield Corporation. A further grant of land was made in 1913 by Sheffield Town Trustees and in 1932 the J G Graves Charitable Trust donated land to the corporation.

The Shepherd Wheel is a working water wheel and museum, located on the Porter Brook where it runs through Whiteley Woods.

White Watson, geologist, was born in Whiteley Woods in the 1760s.

Forge Dam

Forge Dam Park was originally created in 1938 and covered , but today occupies only . The dam was originally built to supply water for the manufacture of cutlery.

Porter Clough
At , Porter Clough is the smallest of the five parks. Long but narrow, and for the most part with steep wooded sides up the valley, its south-western end extends  from the city centre, to join up with the Peak District.

Porter Valley Woodlands 
The Porter Valley Woodlands is a designated local nature reserve (LNR), sited partly within the Porter Valley Parks. It comprises the wooded areas of the parks, together with the adjacent Bluebell Wood.

References

Forests and woodlands of South Yorkshire
Grade II listed parks and gardens in South Yorkshire
Parks in Sheffield
Porter Brook
Local Nature Reserves in South Yorkshire

External links
 Friends of the Porter Valley website.